Yaguajay is a municipality and town in the Sancti Spíritus Province of Cuba. It is located in the northern part of the province, and borders the Bay of Buena Vista to the north.
The Caguanes National Park (protecting swamp and coastal ecosystems, caves and mural art) is located in Yaguajay.

Geography

The municipality was divided into the barrios of Bamburanao, Cabecera, Centeno, Mayajigua, Meneses and Seibabo. It is currently divided into the consejos populares (popular councils, i.e. hamlets) of CAI Aracelio Iglesias, El Río, Iguará, Itabo, Jarahueca, La Loma, Mayajigua, Meneses, CAI Obdulio Morales, Perea, Sansaricq, Seibabo, CAI Simón Bolivar, Turquino I, Turquino II and Venegas.

History 

It was founded in 1847 and established as a municipality in 1879, then part of the province of Las Villas.

The Battle of Yaguajay 

Camilo Cienfuegos fought an important battle in this city one of the last battles of the Cuban Revolution in 1958 defeating a Cuban Army Captain Alfredo Abon Lee, known as El heroe de Yaguajay. In 1958, Fidel Castro ordered his revolutionary army to go on the offensive against the army of Fulgencio Batista. While Fidel led one force against Guisa, Masó and other towns, the other major offensive was directed at the capture of the city of Santa Clara, the capital of what was then Las Villas Province.

Three columns were sent against Santa Clara under the command of Che Guevara, Jaime Vega, and Camilo Cienfuegos. Vega's column was caught in an ambush and completely destroyed. Guevara's column took up positions around Santa Clara (near Fomento). Cienfuegos's column directly attacked a local army garrison at Yaguajay. Initially Cienfuegos's column was just 60 men, out of Castro's hardened core of 230. But as they moved through the lands towards Santa Clara, they gained many recruits. A best guess is that Cienfuegos had between 450 and 500 men fighting for him.

The garrison was some 250 men under the command of a Cuban-born Chinese captain Abon Lee. The attack seems to have started around December 19. Convinced that reinforcements would be sent from Santa Clara, Lee put up a determined defense of his post. Repeatedly, the guerrillas attempted to overpower Lee and his men, but each time they failed. By December 26, Cienfuegos had become quite frustrated; it seemed that Lee could not be overpowered, nor could he be convinced to surrender. In desperation, Cienfuegos used a homemade "tank" against Lee's position. The "tank" was actually a large tractor encased in iron plates with attached makeshift flamethrowers on top. It, too, proved unsuccessful. Finally, on December 30, Lee, out of ammunition, surrendered his garrison
under the realization they could not continue fighting without water, food nor munitions. His intentions were to avoid as many casualties as possible on both sides. Save as many Men fighting under his command and Stop the senseless loss of life that was taking place.
Alfredo Abon Lee was outnumbered 2 to 1 with no reinforcements and no water, no electricity, no food whatsoever and Cienfuego's men used all available tools at their disposal to convince Captain Lee to surrender, including psychological warfare.

Aftermath of the battle 
The surrender of the garrison was a major blow to the defenders of the provincial capital of Santa Clara. The next day, the combined forces of Cienfuegos, Guevara, and local revolutionaries under William Alexander Morgan captured Santa Clara in a fight of vast confusion. News of the loss of Santa Clara and other losses elsewhere panicked Batista and he fled Cuba the next day.

Demographics

In 2004, the municipality of Yaguajay had a population of 58,938.

Notable people 
José Miller
Taismary Agüero, Cuban-Italian volleyball player
Luis Valdés Larralde, MD Discoverer of the Cuevas de Valdés

References

External links

Populated places in Sancti Spíritus Province